Grupo Desportivo Cultural A-dos-Francos is a Portuguese sports club from the city of A dos Francos, a freguesia in the municipality of Caldas da Rainha (Centro Region, Portugal)

Current squad

Titles

Official
 Campeonato Nacional II Divisão
 Winners: 2012–13
 Taça Promoção Feminino
 Winners: 2009–10, 2011–12

References

External links
 GDC A-dos-Francos on UEFA's website
 GDC A-dos-Francos on zerazero.pt

Women's football clubs in Portugal
Sport in Leiria District
Sport in Caldas da Rainha
Campeonato Nacional de Futebol Feminino teams